120 Days was a Norwegian rock band.

Biography 
The band comprises Jonas Dahl, Arne Kvalvik, Kjetil Ovesen, and Ådne Meisfjord, and was formed in Kristiansund in 2001 under the name The Beautiful People. When they changed their name, they took the new name from the Marquis De Sade's 120 Days Of Sodom. Originally based in Kristiansund, they moved to Oslo in 2002. After two EPs on the Public Demand label, the group signed to the Norwegian independent label Smalltown Supersound. Their first album, 120 Days, was released on 10 October 2006, and had several positive reviews in North American publications. The group toured the United States shortly after the album's release. 120 started producing new material for a record after returning to Oslo in 2008, following major touring around the United States and Europe. On 7 June 2012, 120 Days announced that the band would end by September that year. The band had played together for almost 11 years before announcing the last concert in September 2012.

Band members 
 Ådne Meisfjord - vocals and guitar
 Kjetil Ovesen - keyboards
 Jonas Hestvik Dahl - bass guitar
 Arne Kvalvik - drums

Honors 
2006: Two times Spellemannprisen in the categories best Rock band and Newcomer, for the album 120 Days

Discography 
EPs
2003: The Beautiful People (Perfect Pop Records)
2004: Sedated Times (Perfect Pop Records)

Albums
2006: 120 Days (Smalltown Supersound (Norway), Vice records (US) and Traffic (Japan))
2011: 120 Days II (Voices Of Wonder, Splendour)

References

External links 

 

Norwegian rock music groups
Norwegian electronic music groups
Norwegian experimental musical groups
Norwegian experimental rock groups
Spellemannprisen winners
Musical groups established in 2001
2001 establishments in Norway
Musical groups disestablished in 2012
2012 disestablishments in Norway
Musical groups from Kristiansund
Smalltown Supersound artists